Therese Anne Fowler (born April 22, 1967) is a contemporary American author. She is best known for Z: A Novel of Zelda Fitzgerald, published in 2013. The work has been adapted for television by Killer Films and Amazon Studios, with Christina Ricci and David Hoflin in the roles of Zelda and F. Scott Fitzgerald. The series, titled Z: The Beginning of Everything, was released on January 27, 2017.

Fowler is married to the author John Kessel.

Novels

Souvenir (2008), Ballantine Books, 
Reunion (2009),  Ballantine Books, 
Exposure (2011), Ballantine Books, 
Z: A Novel of Zelda Fitzgerald (2013), St. Martin's Press, 
A Well-Behaved Woman: A Novel of the Vanderbilts (2018), St. Martin's Press, 
A Good Neighborhood (2020), St. Martin's Press, 
It All Comes Down to This (2022), St. Martin's Press, ISBN 9781250278074

References

External links
 Official website

21st-century American novelists
American women novelists
1967 births
Living people
21st-century American women writers